The 58th edition of the KNVB Cup started on September 6, 1975. The final was played on April 7, 1976: PSV beat Roda JC 1–0 (after extra time) and won the cup for the third time.

Teams
 All 18 participants of the Eredivisie 1975-76, entering in the second round
 All 19 participants of the Eerste Divisie 1975-76
 9 participants from lower (amateur) leagues

First round
The matches of the first round were played on September 6 and 7, 1975.

1 Eerste Divisie; A Amateur teams

Second round
The matches of the second round were played on October 12, 1975. The Eredivisie clubs entered the tournament this round.

E Eredivisie

Round of 16
The matches of the round of 16 were played on November 6 and 7, 1975.

Quarter finals
The quarter finals were played between February 25 and 29, 1976.

Semi-finals
The semi-finals were played on March 10, 1976.

Final

PSV also became champions of the Netherlands by winning the Eredivisie 1975-76, thereby taking the double. They would participate in the European Cup next season, so finalists Roda JC could enter the Cup Winners' Cup tournament.

See also
 Eredivisie 1975-76
 Eerste Divisie 1975-76

References

External links
 Netherlands Cup Full Results 1970–1994 by the RSSSF

1975-76
1975–76 domestic association football cups
KNVB Cup